Shaolin Handlock (十字鎖喉手) is a 1978 Shaw Brothers film directed by Ho Meng Hua, starring Lo Lieh and David Chiang.

Plot
Li  Bai (Dick Wei) is the creator and master of the 'Shi Zi So Hou Shou' (which basically is a ' Throat Locking Hand', otherwise known as 'Shaolin Hand Lock') who passes down the skill to his children Cheng Ying (David Chiang) and Meng Ping (Chen Ping). However, an old friend Fang Yun Biao (Chan Shen) visits Li Bai and manages to kill him by attacking the skills only weakness and unknowingly, also kills his two other students to whom he believed were Li Bai's children. After his children find out of the murder, Cheng Ying sets out to avenge his father. Travelling to Thailand to kill Fang and before that, gives him information of who hired him - the rich benevolent Lin Hao (Lo Lieh). In the process, he attracts Lin Hao into accepting him as a bodyguard by stealing and retaining in custody gold that belonged to Lin Hao. While suspected by other guards, Lin Hao remains in a difficult situation to find out if Li Bai's siblings are still alive and what Cheng Ying is really there for...

Cast
Lo Lieh – Lin Hao
David Chiang – Li Cheng Ying
Michael Chan – Li Kun Shi
Dick Wei - Li Bai
Chen Ping - Li Meng Ping
Kara Hui - Li's student
Chan Shen - Fang Yun Biao

External links
 

Funimation
Kung fu films
Hong Kong martial arts films
Shaw Brothers Studio films
Films directed by Ho Meng Hua
1970s Hong Kong films